

Benson Bubblers

More than fifty drinking fountains called Benson Bubblers, named after Simon Benson and designed by A. E. Doyle, are located in and around downtown Portland.

Portland Parks & Recreation
Portland Parks & Recreation maintains 19 fountains throughout the city, including one in North Portland (McCoy Fountain), one in Northeast Portland (Holladay Park Fountain), two in Northwest Portland (Jamison Square Fountain and Horse Trough Fountain), and one in Southeast Portland (The Rose Petal). The agency maintains 14 fountains in Southwest Portland: Animals in Pools, Bill Naito Legacy Fountain, "The Car Wash" (officially Untitled), Chimney Fountain, The Dreamer, Keller Fountain, Kelly Fountain, Lovejoy Fountain, Pioneer Courthouse Square Waterfall Fountain, Salmon Street Springs, Shemanski Fountain, Skidmore Fountain, Teachers Fountain, and Thompson Elk Fountain. The Portland Water Bureau has published a two-hour, 2.6-mile self-guided tour featuring twelve fountains in Southwest Portland (with an optional extension to Jamison Square Fountain in Northwest Portland).

Regional Arts & Culture Council
Fountains administered by the Regional Arts & Culture Council include the Frank E. Beach Memorial Fountain.

See also
 Charles Frederic Swigert Jr. Memorial Fountain (1983), Oregon Zoo
 Chiming Fountain (1891), Washington Park
 Essential Forces (1995)
 Fountain for Company H (1914), Plaza Blocks
 Loyal B. Stearns Memorial Fountain (1941), Washington Park
 Pioneer Woman (Littman), 1956

References

External links
 

 
Culture of Portland, Oregon
Portland, Oregon